Pinny Grylls is a documentary filmmaker.

In 2002 Grylls and Rachel Millward co-founded the Birds Eye View Film Festival. BEV showcased films by emerging women filmmakers from around the world and became the UK's first major film festival for female filmmakers.

Grylls directed the 2007 multi award winning short documentary 'Peter and Ben'. It screened at London International Film Festival  and IDFA  where it was nominated for prestigious Silver Cub Award. It won Best Documentary at Aspen Shorts Fest 2008 and 3 awards at the 5th London Short Film Festival - the FourDocs Award for Best Documentary the VX Auteur Award and 'Highly Commended' for the Best Film Award. It also won the SXSouthWest Click Grand Jury Prize in 2008. It also screened in the International Competition at Clermont-Ferrand Short Film Festival 2008. In 2009 it won the Shooting People Werner Herzog Competition.

In 2010 she directed a First Cut episode for Channel 4; "Who Do You Think You Were?" explored the phenomenon of past life regression.

On 19 December 2010 Grylls was featured in an Observer article as one of a crop of 'innovative daring directors' making short films for the web. Observer, 19 December 2010.

In 2012 Pinny Grylls made The Hour for The National Theatre, and in 2014 Becoming Zerlina  for The Royal Opera House. In 2015 she made Thank you Women for the Guardian  for The Guardian. In 2021 she made Skin Hunger for Theatre Company Dante or Die.

She is the director of Hear My Voice a feature film. It is also supported by Future Foundation for London.

In 2014 Pinny wrote The Very Best Sheepdog, illustrated by Rosie Wellesley, published by Pavilion Books.

Personal life
As a child Grylls attended Children's Film Unit and Westminster School. She studied Anthropology and Archaeology at Oxford University at Hertford College. She is the daughter of British artist Vaughan Grylls and theatre designer Gillian Daniell, and step daughter of publisher Polly Powell. She is married to actor Sam Crane

References

External links
 
 'Peter and Ben' on YouTube
 pinnygrylls.co.uk

English film directors
Living people
English documentary filmmakers
People educated at Westminster School, London
Alumni of Hertford College, Oxford
Year of birth missing (living people)